Dog Creek is a tributary of the Fraser River in the Cariboo region of the Canadian province of British Columbia, entering that river south of the confluence of the Chilcotin River.] The eponymous community of Dog Creek is located on the northeast side of the creek's confluence with the Fraser.

See also
List of rivers of British Columbia

References

Tributaries of the Fraser River
Rivers of the Cariboo
Fraser Canyon
Lillooet Land District